Ulyana Voitsik (born 12 October 1989) is a Belarusian retired ice hockey player. During her career, she played as a forward with the HK Pantera Minsk of the Elite Women's Hockey League (EWHL), the Istanbul Buz Korsanları SK of the Turkish Women's Ice Hockey League, and Korolevy Dnepra of the Ukrainian Women's Ice Hockey Championship.

Career
Between 2011 and 2014, she played in her country for HK Pantera Minsk and participated at three matches of the 2013–14 IIHF European Women's Champions Cup.

In the 2015–16 season, Voitsik played for the Turkish team Istanbul Buz Korsanları SK, and enjoyed Turkish Ice Hockey Women's League champion title.

Honours
 Turkish Ice Hockey Women's League
 Istanbul Buz Korsanları SK
 Champion (1): 2015–16.

References

External links 
 

1989 births
Living people
Belarusian women's ice hockey players
Women's ice hockey forwards
Istanbul Buz Korsanları players
Belarusian expatriate ice hockey people
Belarusian expatriate sportspeople in Turkey
Belarusian expatriate sportspeople in Ukraine
Place of birth missing (living people)
European Women's Hockey League players
Expatriate ice hockey players in Turkey
Expatriate ice hockey players in Ukraine